Pellenes modicus is a jumping spider species in the genus Pellenes that lives in South Africa and Tanzania. It was first described in 2000.

References

Fauna of Tanzania
Salticidae
Spiders of Africa
Spiders described in 2000
Taxa named by Wanda Wesołowska